Craspedochiton elegans is a chiton species in the genus Craspedochiton.

References

Acanthochitonidae
Molluscs described in 1925